Dorcel TV is a subscription based pay-TV adult entertainment television channel distributed throughout Europe via digital cable and satellite television. It is owned by Marc Dorcel. Its content is mostly hardcore pornography, some including faked orgasms.

Dorcel TV will also launched in Quebec in 2018.

References

External links
 Official website
 Official website (Video-On-Demand)

Television channels in the Netherlands
Television stations in France
Pornographic television channels
Television pornography
Mass media in Reuver